The guilder or florin was the currency of the Netherlands from the 15th century until 2002, when it was replaced by the euro.

The Dutch name gulden was a Middle Dutch adjective meaning "golden", and reflects the fact that, when first introduced in 1434, its value was about equal to (i.e., it was on par with) the Italian gold florin. The Dutch guilder was a de facto reserve currency in Europe in the 17th and 18th centuries.

Between 1999 and 2002, the guilder was officially a "national subunit" of the euro. However, physical payments could only be made in guilders, as no euro coins or banknotes were available. The exact exchange rate, still relevant for old contracts and for exchange of the old currency for euros at the central bank, is 2.20371 Dutch guilders for 1 euro. Inverted, this gives 0.453780 euros for 1 guilder.

Derived from the Dutch guilder are the Netherlands Antillean guilder (still in use in Curaçao and Sint Maarten) and the Surinamese guilder (replaced in 2004 by the Surinamese dollar).

History
The gulden emerged as the official currency of the Burgundian Netherlands after the 1434 monetary reform done under Philip the Good. This table summarizes the gulden's value in terms of silver until the gold standard was introduced in 1875.

Prior to 1434 the Dutch issued currency conforming to the Carolingian monetary system, with the Pound divided into 20 shillings and the shilling divided into 12 pennies. Dutch versions of the penny first came out in the 9th century, followed by local versions of the one-shilling gros tournois in the 13th century. The most notable version of the latter, the Flemish grote, subsequently depreciated faster than its counterparts in France, from its initial fine silver content of 4.044 g, to around 2.5 g by 1350 AD, and to just 0.815 g before the reforms of 1434.

1434-66, Burgundian Netherlands

Philip the Good devised a monetary system in 1434 relating the new Dutch currency to that of its neighbors: the French livre parisis of 38.25 g silver, and the English pound sterling of 215.8 g. The following units were defined:
 The Stuiver of 1.63 g fine silver, equal to 2 Flemish grote or 3 Brabant grote, and approximately equal to the French sol (shilling) of 1.9125 g;
 The Gulden, equal to 20 stuiver or 32.6 g fine silver, and approximately equal to the French livre parisis. As the French gold livre was about par with the gold florin of 3.5 g, this new denomination was therefore known as the gouden florijn, or gulden, or florin.
 The Shilling Flemish (Schelling Vlaams), equal to 12 Flemish grote or 6 stuivers, and approximately equal to the English shilling of 12 pence sterling.
 And finally, the Pound Flemish (Pond Vlaams), equal to 240 Flemish grote or 6 Gulden, and at 195.6 g fine silver was approximately equal to the English pound sterling.

The stuiver weighed 3.4 g of  silver fineness and was divided into 8 duiten or 16 penningen.

French écus, English nobles & Dutch florins comprised the gold currency of the Low Countries and had a variable rate against the stuiver. A denomination worth 1 Gulden did not exist until the 1464 issue of the Sint Andries florin containing 2.735 g of fine gold, but this was a mere two years before the resumption of debasements in the stuiver.

1500-60, Spanish Netherlands

The stuiver modestly depreciated between 1466 and 1475 before incurring more significant debasements up to the end of the 15th century. From 1469 to 1475 an agreement with England made the English groat (4-pence; 2.88 g fine silver) mutually exchangeable with the Burgundian double patard (or 2-stuiver) minted under Charles the Rash.

Follow-up attempts to issue 1-gulden coins resulted in the minting of the gold Karolusgulden of 1.77 g fine gold in 1520, and the silver Karolusgulden of 19.07 grams fine silver in 1541. The bullion content of French and English currencies would eventually approach this value, with the French livre parisis becoming 20.4 g fine silver in 1549, and th of a pound sterling becoming 19.2 g fine silver in 1551.

1618, Dutch Republic

The pace of depreciation of the Gulden quickened in the second half of the 16th century amidst the huge influx of precious metals from Germany & Spanish America arriving through the Habsburg Netherlands.

The loss in silver content of local Dutch coins in the form of stuivers, schellings (6 stuivers) and daalders ( gulden or 30 stuivers) was the result of different provinces continually testing the market with coins of slightly reduced silver, aiming for their acceptance at par with full-bodied coins. As the Northern Dutch Republic just declared its independence from the Spanish crown, there was no central authority powerful enough to penalize the provinces responsible for the deterioration of the quality of Dutch currency. The inevitable official acceptance of new, debased rates for the gulden only set the stage for the next round of depreciations.

As a result, the gulden equivalent of different trade coins passing through the Low Countries also rose in value, as follows:
 The German Reichsthaler of 25.98 g fine silver was valued at 32 stuivers (1.6G) in 1566.
 The Dutch Republic's leeuwendaalder (Liondollar) of 20.57g fine silver was valued at 32 stuivers (1.6G) in 1575.
 The Dutch Republic's Rijksdaalder of 25.40 g fine silver, a local version of the German reichsthaler, was valued at 42 stuivers (2.1G) in 1583, and repeatedly raised in value until it reached 50 stuivers (2.5G) in 1618 - hence, 10.16 g silver in a gulden.
 The Spanish Netherlands’ patagon or Albertus thaler of 24.56 g fine silver, valued at 8 shillings Flemish (48 stuivers, 2.4G) in 1618.
 The Spanish Netherlands’ ducaton of 30.70 g fine silver, valued at 10 shillings Flemish (60 stuivers, 3G) in 1618.

The solution which immediately halted the downward spiral of the gulden was the establishment of the Amsterdam Wisselbank (Bank of Amsterdam) in 1609, mandated to accept & assay the bullion content of coins received from its depositors, and then to credit the equivalent of 1 Rijksdaalder ( gulden after 1618) for each 25.40 g fine silver actually received. Combined with rules requiring payments above 600 gulden to be cleared through the bank, it halted incentives for provinces to tamper with the silver content of its coins.

In 1626, Pieter Schaghen wrote in Dutch of the purchase of "the Island Manhattes" (Manhattan) "from the Indians for the value of 60 guilders."

1659, Gulden currency & banco

Even with the Bank of Amsterdam's success in halting the depreciation of Dutch currency, attempts to further increase the stuiver equivalent of trade coins continued among the provinces. After the 1630s came moves to raise the Patagon's value from 48 to 50 stuivers (4.17% advance), followed by moves to raise the Ducaton's value from 60 to 63 stuivers (5.0% advance). Fearing damage to its Europe-wide reputation if 50-stuiver deposits in rixdollars were repaid in cheaper 50-stuiver patagons, in the 1640s the bank firmly rejected the advanced values of these coins and upheld its old values of 48 and 60 stuivers.

This was the origin of a permanent Gulden Banco valued at 5% more against provincial Gulden currency valuations. In 1659 the Dutch Republic made this duality permanent by issuing its own trade coins, namely:
 The Silver Ducat (Zilveren Dukat; also called "Rijksdaalder") of 24.36 g fine silver, replacing the Patagon and valued at 48 stuivers banco (2.4 GB) or 50 stuivers currency (2.5G).
 The Silver Rider Ducaton of 30.45 g fine silver, replacing the Dukaton and valued at 60 stuivers banco (3 GB) or 63 stuivers currency (3.15G).

The result was a Gulden Banco unit of 10.15 g silver & a Gulden currency unit of 9.67 g silver as determined from the ducaton. These reforms helped cement the Dutch Republic's role as Europe's financial center, made the Bank of Amsterdam the world's first modern central bank, and made the bank-stabilized Gulden as Europe's de facto reserve currency until the end of the 18th century.  In 1694, a new mint ordinance recognized the gulden as a valid coin for the entire Republic.

As the bank was also an active reseller of negotiepenningen, or trade coins that happen to be undervalued in the Netherlands (e.g. older rixdollars still valued at 50 stuivers currency), Dutch trade coins like liondollars, rixdollars & silver ducats were exported and became staple currency for the rest of Europe until the end of the 18th century. The Royal Dutch Mint still mints the famed silver ducat to this day.

A silver 1-gulden denomination weighing 10.61 g, 0.91 fine, was minted by the States of Holland and West Friesland in 1680. The gulden design featured Pallas Athena standing, holding a spear topped by a hat in her right hand, resting with her left forearm on Gospels set on an ornate basis, with a small shield in the legend.

19th century, United Netherlands
Following the collapse of the Bank of Amsterdam in the aftermath of the Napoleonic Wars, in 1817 the United Kingdom of the Netherlands redefined the Gulden as either 9.613 g silver or 0.60561 g gold. It was decimally divided into 100 cents, and the 1-Gulden coin was permanently issued. This standard was doomed to fail due to
 The existence in the former Austrian Netherlands of silver kronenthalers of 25.71 g fine silver valued at 2.7 Gulden (hence, only 9.52 g per Gulden), and
 The Gulden's gold equivalent of 0.60561 g, at a Gold-Silver ratio of 15.5 in neighboring France, was worth only 9.39 g in silver.

Following Belgium's secession from the Netherlands in 1830, a more permanent solution was implemented in 1840 by reducing the Gulden to 9.45 g fine silver and repealing its fixed equivalence in gold.

Gold Standard
As a result of the adoption of the Gold Standard by the newly established German Empire in 1873, the Netherlands in 1875 repealed the free coinage of silver into Gulden coins, substituted by the free coinage of gold into 10-Gulden coins containing 6.048 g fine gold. This arrangement continued until the worldwide suspension of the gold standard in 1914 due to the First World War. The gold standard was revived in 1925 but was abandoned in 1936.

After 1914
In 1914 the guilder was traded at a rate of 2.46 guilders = 1 U.S. dollar. As of 1938, the rate was 1.82 guilders = 1 U.S. dollar. One Dutch guilder in 1914 could buy roughly the same amount of goods and services as 10.02 U.S. dollars or 8.17 euros in December 2017. In 1938, the guilder purchasing power would be approximately equal to 9.54 U.S. dollars or 7.78 euros in December 2017. Overall, the guilder remained a very stable currency and was also the third highest-valued currency unit in Europe in the interwar period (after the British Pound Sterling and the Irish pound, which, at this time, were pegged to each other at par).

Following the German occupation, on 10 May 1940, the guilder was pegged to the Reichsmark at a rate of 1 guilder = 1.5 Reichsmark. This rate was reduced to 1.327 on 17 July of the same year. The liberating Allied forces set an exchange rate of 2.652 guilders = 1 U.S. dollar, which became the peg for the guilder within the Bretton Woods system. In 1949, the peg was changed to 3.8 guilders = 1 dollar, approximately matching the devaluation of the British pound. In 1961, the guilder was revalued to 3.62 guilders = 1 dollar, a change approximately in line with that of the German mark. After 1967 guilders were made from nickel instead of silver.

Euro changeover
In 2002, the guilder was replaced by the euro at an exchange rate of 2.20371 guilders = 1 Euro. Coins remained exchangeable for euros at branches of the Netherlands Central Bank until 1 January 2007. Most guilder banknotes that were valid at the time of conversion can be exchanged until the deadline of 1 January 2032. There are some exceptions to this, and furthermore no banknote received as payment for commercial goods or services after 27 January 2002 is exchangeable. Refer Banknotes of the Dutch guilder for a full list of guilder Banknotes and their last valid exchange date.

Coins

In the 18th century, coins were issued by the various provinces. Gold 1 and 2 ducat trade coins were also minted. Between 1795 and 1806, the Batavian Republic issued coins in similar denominations to the earlier provincial issues. The Kingdom of Holland minted silver 10 stuivers, 1 florin and 1 guilder (equivalent), 50 stuivers and  guilder (also equivalent) and 1 rijksdaalder, along with gold 10 and 20 guilders. Before decimalization, the Kingdom of the Netherlands briefly issued some 1 rijksdaalder coins.

The gold 1 and 2 ducat and silver ducat (rijksdaalder) are still minted today as bullion coins.

In 1817, the first coins of the decimal currency were issued, the copper 1 cent and silver 3 guilders. The remaining denominations were introduced in 1818. These were copper  cents, silver 5, 10 and 25 cents,  and 1 guilder, and gold 10 guilders. In 1826, gold 5-guilder coins were introduced.

In 1840, the silver content of the coinage was reduced (see above) and this was marked by the replacement of the 3 guilder coin by a  guilder piece. The gold coinage was completely suspended in 1853, five years after the suspension of the gold standard. By 1874, production of silver coins greater in value than 10 cents had ceased, to be only fully resumed in the 1890s. Gold 10 guilder coins were struck again from 1875. In 1877, bronze  cent coins were introduced. In 1907, silver 5-cent coins were replaced by round, cupro-nickel pieces. These were later replaced in 1913 by square shaped 5 cent pieces. In 1912, gold 5-guilder coins were reintroduced but the gold coinage was ended in 1933. The  guilder saw discontinuation after 1930. Throughout the Wilhelmina period, a number of infrequent changes were made to the 10 and 25 cent coins as well, with the largest changes being periodic updates of the Queen's effigy and smaller changes to designs on the reverse (back).

In 1941, following the German occupation, production of all earlier coin types ceased and zinc coins were introduced by the occupational government for 1, 5, 10 and 25 cents. Large quantities of pre-war type silver 10 and 25 cent and 1 guilder coins were minted in the United States between 1943 and 1945 for use following liberation. Afterwards, the zinc coins were quickly demonetized and melted.

In 1948, all half cents and  cents were taken out of circulation, though no further production of either denomination had continued after 1940 and 1942, respectively. New bronze 1 and 5 cent coins featuring Queen Wilhelmina on the obverse were issued, phasing out previous types. At the same time, new nickel 10 and 25 cent coins were introduced. In 1949, 1 and  guilder banknotes were introduced. Five years later, the silver 1-guilder coin was reintroduced, followed by the silver  guilder coin in 1959. The silver content was replaced with nickel in 1967, although no  guilder coins were minted in 1967 and 1968. The silver coins were demonetized in 1973. In 1950, Queen Juliana's profile replaced the image of Wilhelmina on the obverse (front) of all coins.

In 1980, production of the 1-cent coin ceased and was demonetized three years later. Soon after, it was decided to replace the 5-guilder banknote with a coin of the same value. However, it was not until 1988 that a bronze-coated nickel 5 guilder coin was finally introduced. The 5 guilder banknote remained legal tender until 1995. The  guilder coin gradually began losing widespread use shortly after the introduction of the 5 guilder coin, and mintage figures for the denomination declined until the discontinuation of the guilder. 1980 also saw a circulating two coin commemorative series of 1 and  guilder coins celebrating Queen Beatrix's ascension to the throne.

All circulating coins went through a complete redesign in 1982, a short while after Queen Beatrix's coronation. They depict abstract designs featuring grids and a layered silhouette profile of the Queen as opposed to the more formal designs of the previous generation of coins. Production of these coins ceased after 2001.

At the time of withdrawal, the following denominations of coins were circulating:

5 cents (€0.023) – stuiver—the name survived, although the stuiver had not been an official subunit of the guilder since decimalisation in 1817;
10 cents (€0.045) – dubbeltje ("little double")—being small enough to fit into the center hole of a compact disc, it was the smallest coin in circulation. It was worth two stuivers, hence the name;
25 cents (€0.11) – kwartje ("little quarter")—the kwartje was smaller than the stuiver, though larger than the dubbeltje and the cent;
1 guilder (€0.45) – gulden, colloquially piek;
 guilders (€1.13) – rijksdaalder, colloquially riks or knaak;
5 guilders (€2.27) – vijfje ("little five");

All the coins carried a profile image of the Queen on the obverse and a simple grid on the other side. The 1-guilder,  guilder, and 5-guilder coins had God zij met ons ("God be with us") inscribed on the edge.

Banknotes

Between 1814 and 1838, The Dutch Bank issued notes in denominations of 25, 40, 60, 80, 100, 200, 300, 500 and 1000 guilders. These were followed, from 1846 by state notes (muntbiljetten) in denominations of 5, 10, 20, 50, 100, 500, 1000 guilders, with the 10 and 50 guilders issued until 1914.

In 1904, the Netherlands Bank recommenced the issuance of paper money. By 1911, it was issuing notes for 10, 25, 40, 60, 100, 200, 300 and 1000 guilders. In 1914, because of silver shortage for minting, the government introduced silver certificates (zilverbonnen) for 1,  and 5 guilders. Although the 5 guilder notes were only issued that year, the 1 guilder notes continued until 1920 and the  guilder until 1927.

In 1926, the Netherlands Bank introduced 20 guilder notes, followed by 50 guilder in 1929 and 500 guilder in 1930. These introductions followed the cessation of production of the unusual 40, 60 and 300 guilder notes during the 1920s.

In 1938, silver notes were reintroduced for 1 and  guilders. During World War II, the Netherlands Bank continued to issue paper money, although there were some design changes, most notably, the replacement of a portrait of Queen Emma by a Rembrandt portrait on the 10-guilder note. The Allies printed state notes dated 1943 for use following liberation. These were in denominations of 1, 10, 25, 50 and 100 guilders. More state notes were issued for 1 and  guilders in 1945 and 1949.

Following the war, The Dutch Bank introduced notes for 10, 20, 25, 50, 100 and 1000 guilders. The last 20 guilder notes were dated 1955, whilst 5 guilder notes were introduced in 1966 (replaced by coins in 1988) and 250 guilder notes in 1985.

At the time of withdrawal, the following denominations of banknotes were circulating:

 ƒ10 (€4.54) – tientje ("little ten", see Diminutive), joet
 ƒ25 (€11.34) – geeltje (yellow one)
 ƒ50 (€22.69) – zonnebloem (sunflower)
 ƒ100 (€45.38) – honderdje, meier, later: snip (snipe)
 ƒ250 (€113.45) – vuurtoren (lighthouse)
 ƒ1000 (€453.78) – duizendje, (rooie) rug (red back) / rooi(tj)e

At the time of withdrawal, all but the 50 and 250 guilder notes had been issued in a new series that was the same colour as the older, long-serving notes but with a mostly abstract pattern, featuring a different bird for each denomination.

Persons depicted on older banknotes were:
 ƒ5 – poet Joost van den Vondel (the note was replaced by a ƒ5 coin in 1988 and withdrawn from circulation in 1995)
 ƒ10 – painter Frans Hals
 ƒ25 – composer Jan Pietersz. Sweelinck
 ƒ100 – admiral Michiel de Ruyter (This being the most profitable note to counterfeit it was first replaced by a note featuring the common snipe. This note was of a similar design as the newly introduced 50 and 250-guilder notes; and was again replaced by an abstract design in the last series of guilder notes)
 ƒ1000 – philosopher Baruch de Spinoza

These 1970s "face"-notes and the 1980s ƒ50 (sunflower), ƒ100 (snipe) and ƒ250 (lighthouse) were designed by R.D.E. Oxenaar. Eventually all faces were to be replaced by abstracts, designed by Jaap Drupsteen (see above).

See also 
 Aruban florin
 Caribbean guilder
 Dutch euro coins
 Economy of the Netherlands
 Netherlands Antillean guilder
 Netherlands Indian guilder

References

External links 
 The Marteau Early 18th century Currency Converter with tools to convert early 18th century Dutch Guilders into the major contemporary European currencies.
 Overview of the Dutch guilder and its history from the BBC
 

1832 establishments in the Netherlands
2001 disestablishments in the Netherlands
Currencies of Europe
Currencies of the Kingdom of the Netherlands
Currencies replaced by the euro
Economic history of the Netherlands
Modern obsolete currencies
Economic history of the Dutch Republic
Netherlands